Noel Casey is a former Irish sportsperson. He played hurling with the Clare senior inter-county team and won an All Star award in 1978, being picked in the centre forward position.

References

External links
Clare GAA All Stars Article

Living people
Clare inter-county hurlers
Year of birth missing (living people)